Fafinski is a Polish surname.

People
Jacek Fafiński, Olympic silver medalist during the 1996 Summer Olympics in Atlanta
Dr Stefan Fafinski DL, Master of the Worshipful Company of Information Technologists for 2017-18, Deputy Lieutenant for the Royal County of Berkshire

External links
Fafinski at Ancestry.com.